Maxwellia is the scientific name of two genera of organisms and may refer to:

Maxwellia (gastropod), a genus of sea snails in the family Muricidae
Maxwellia (plant), a genus of plants in the family Malvaceae